At the 2006 Winter Paralympics, 20 cross-country skiing events were contested at Pragelato.

Medal table

Events

Men
 5 km
 Sitting
 Standing
 Visually impaired
 10 km
 Sitting
 Standing
 Visually impaired
 15 km
 Sitting
 20 km
 Standing
 Visually impaired
 1×3.75 km + 2×5 km relay
 open

Women
 2.5 km
 Sitting
 5 km
 Standing
 Visually impaired
 Sitting
 10 km
 Standing
 Visually impaired
 Sitting
 15 km
 Standing
 Visually impaired
 3×2.5 km relay
 open

Men's events

Men's short distance

Men's middle distance

Men's long distance

Men's relay 1x3.75 km + 2x5 km

Women's events

Women's short distance

Women's middle distance

Women's long distance

Women's relay 3x2.5 km

See also
Cross-country skiing at the 2006 Winter Olympics

References

 
 Winter Sport Classification, Canadian Paralympic Committee
 Torino 2006, paraphoto.org, March 12, 2006
 Torino 2006, paraphoto.org, March 15, 2006
 Torino 2006, paraphoto.org, March 17, 2006
 Torino 2006, paraphoto.org, March 19, 2006

 
2006 Winter Paralympics events
2006
Paralympics